Z36 was one of five Type 1936B destroyers built for the Kriegsmarine (German Navy) during World War II. Completed in early 1944, the ship spent the war in the Baltic Sea, escorting German ships, laying minefields, and bombarding Soviet forces. On 12 December, a navigational error caused her to enter a German minefield as she was preparing to lay another minefield in the Gulf of Finland off the Estonian coast. Z36 struck a single mine and sank with the loss of all hands. The wreck was surveyed in 1994.

Design and description
The Type 1936B design retained the hull design of the Type 1936A, but reverted to the lighter main armament of the Type 1936 to reduce topweight and improve seakeeping. Their crew consisted of 11–15 officers and 305–20 sailors.

The Type 1936B ships carried five  SK C/34 guns in single mounts with gun shields, two each superimposed, fore and aft of the superstructure. The fifth mount was positioned on top of the rear deckhouse. The guns were designated No. 1 to 5 from front to rear. Their anti-aircraft armament consisted of four  SK C/30 guns in two twin mounts abreast the rear funnel and fifteen  C/38 guns in three quadruple and three single mounts. The ship carried eight above-water  torpedo tubes in two power-operated mounts. Two reloads were provided for each mount. They had four depth charge launchers and mine rails could be fitted on the rear deck that had a maximum capacity of 74–76 mines. 'GHG' (Gruppenhorchgerät) passive hydrophones were fitted to detect submarines and a S-Gerät sonar was also probably fitted. The ships were equipped with a FuMO 24/25 radar set above the bridge.

Construction and career
Z36 was originally ordered as a Type 1938B destroyer from AG Weser (Deschimag) on 28 June 1939, but the contract was cancelled when the Type 1938B design was abandoned, and the ship was reordered as a Type 1936A (Mob) destroyer. That was changed to a Type 1936B on 17 February 1941. She was laid down as yard number W1006 on 15 September at Deschimag's Bremen shipyard, launched on 15 May 1943 and commissioned on 19 February 1944, under the command of Korvettenkapitän (Lieutenant Commander) Fredric von Hausen. After working up Z36 was assigned to the 6. Zerstörerflotille (6th Destroyer Flotilla) in mid-1944.

In preparation for Operation Tanne West, the occupation of Åland in case of Finnish surrender, the flotilla escorted the heavy cruiser Lützow to the island of Utö on 28 June, but the operation was canceled and the ships returned to port. On 30 July and 1 August Z36 and three other destroyers of the flotilla sailed into the Gulf of Riga to bombard Soviet positions inland. On 5 August, they escorted the heavy cruiser  as she engaged targets on the island of Ösel, Estonia, and in Latvia on 19–20 August. Z36 and the destroyer  escorted the troopship MV Monte Rosa, laden with refugees, from Baltischport, Estonia, to Gotenhafen, Germany, on 16 September. That month, the flotilla also covered the convoys evacuating Finland and then Reval. From 10 to 15 October the flotilla escorted Lützow and Prinz Eugen as they resumed their shore bombardment missions and bombarded targets themselves, attacking Soviet positions at Memel and Libau. The following month, the flotilla and the heavy cruisers  and Prinz Eugen shelled Soviet positions during the evacuation of Sworbe, on Ösel, between 20 and 24 November.

In mid-December, the 6. T23 was to escort the other ships and the destroyers were laden with 68 mines each. The mission was postponed to the night of 11/12 December because of bad weather and the flotilla sailed on the morning of the 11th. The weather gradually worsened over the course of the day and the spray and rain made navigation difficult. Around 02:00, Z36 struck a mine and sank very quickly with the loss of all hands.

Notes

Bibliography

Further reading

External links
Z36 on german-navy.de
German Destroyers on Battleships-Cruisers.co.uk

Type 1936B destroyers
Ships built in Bremen (state)
1943 ships
World War II shipwrecks in the Baltic Sea
Maritime incidents in December 1944
Ships sunk by mines
Shipwrecks in the Gulf of Finland
Ships lost with all hands